Robert M. Corich is a remastering engineer and record producer, who started his career as an IBM mainframe operator, engineer and consultant where he wrote courses and books on the IBM mainframes and operating systems, often lecturing in these topics all over the world.

His love of music then moved him into the audio world as a studio hand, moving onto engineering and production.

He specialised as a mastering engineer, reworking catalogues and remastering for major bands such as Uriah Heep, Status Quo., Chris Squire of Yes, Manfred Mann's Earth Band, Osibisa, Nazareth, Budgie, Rainbow, Walter Egan, Fairport Convention, Family, Roger Chapman, Magnum, Medicine Head, John Fiddler, Ken Hensley, Chelsea, Girlschool, Gene Loves Jezebel, Jay Aston, Paladin, Gentle Giant, Ian Gillan, John Lawton, Rebel, Zar, John Rabbit Bundrick, Manny Charlton, Native Son, Caravan, Jessica Blake, Crawler and many more at the height of the CD age also producing new releases, anthology sets, historical releases and live albums for many of these artists.

His production company Red Steel Productions often designed the artwork and packaging along with Andrew Buckle and Rachel Gutek of Guppy Art 

Corich has also been involved in writing extensive liner notes and books for many of the artists, as his research and knowledge of the rock scene of the 60s, 70s and 80s is very well documented.
Corich has been involved in a wide variety of projects, he remastered the complete back catalogs of Manfred Mann's Earth Band, Budgie and Uriah Heep discography in the early 90s and again nearly ten years later. He also featured as a critic in the DVD documentaries series "Inside" for bands such as Led Zeppelin, Emerson, Lake and Palmer, 
Pink Floyd, The Who, Genesis, Deep Purple, Supertramp, Black Sabbath, Thin Lizzy, Slade, Uriah Heep, Wishbone Ash, Sensational Alex Harvey Band and Van Der Graff Generatorto name a few.

He has also written books on The Eagles, Led Zeppelin, The Who, AC/DC, ABBA, The Ramones, Thin Lizzy, Supertramp, Slade, Uriah Heep and Osibisa to name a few.

In recent years Corich relaunched his record label Red Steel Music and along with his production company is working with classic British rock acts along with newcomers to the scene. He is currently producing new albums for Osibisa and Looking For Droids as well as continuing to work on as yet unannounced historical musical projects.

References

External links
 Red Steel Music Website
 Uriah Heep Website
 Status Quo Site

Living people
British record producers
Place of birth missing (living people)
Year of birth missing (living people)